Umar Muhammad (born July 25, 1975) from Edinburg, Texas is a former American football linebacker who played nine seasons in the Arena Football League with the Albany/Indiana Firebirds, Grand Rapids Rampage, Tampa Bay Storm, Georgia Force and New Orleans VooDoo. He played college football at the University of North Texas.

Professional career

Albany/Indiana Firebirds
Muhammad played for the Albany/Indiana Firebirds from 2000 to 2002. Muhammad was re-signed on March 21, 2002. He was released by the Firebirds on February 1, 2003.

Grand Rapids Rampage
Muhammad signed with the Grand Rapids Rampage on February 13, 2003.

Georgia Force
Muhammad was signed by the Georgia Force on November 13, 2003. He was released by the Force on December 3, 2003.

Tampa Bay Storm
Muhammad signed with the Tampa Bay Storm on April 9, 2004. He played for the team from 2004 to 2006.

Georgia Force
Muhammad played for the Force during the 2007 season, earning Second Team All-Arena honors. He was released by the Force on January 22, 2008.

New Orleans VooDoo
Muhammad was signed by the New Orleans VooDoo on January 29, 2008.

References

External links
Just Sports Stats

Living people
1975 births
Players of American football from Texas
American football linebackers
African-American players of American football
North Texas Mean Green football players
Albany Firebirds players
Indiana Firebirds players
Grand Rapids Rampage players
Tampa Bay Storm players
Georgia Force players
New Orleans VooDoo players
People from Edinburg, Texas
21st-century African-American sportspeople
20th-century African-American sportspeople